Almost a Rescue is a 1913 American short comedy film featuring Fatty Arbuckle.

Cast
 Donald MacDonald as Hawkeye
 Roscoe 'Fatty' Arbuckle as Jimmie
 Irene Hunt as May Smith
 Billie Bennett as Maud Smith
 Eddie Lyons as Kussie #1
 Lee Moran as Kussie #2
 Russell Bassett as Dr. Quack

See also
 List of American films of 1913
 Fatty Arbuckle filmography

External links

1913 films
American silent short films
Silent American comedy films
1913 comedy films
American black-and-white films
Films directed by Al Christie
1913 short films
American comedy short films
1910s American films